Palfuria retusa is a spider species of the family Zodariidae.

Distribution
P. retusa occurs in South Africa.

References
 Szüts, T. & Jocqué, R. (2001). A revision of the Afrotropical spider genus Palfuria (Araneae, Zodariidae). Journal of Arachnology 29(2):205–219. PDF

Endemic fauna of South Africa
Zodariidae
Spiders of Africa
Spiders described in 1910